Alada Halli, Shivamogga  is a village in the southern state of Karnataka, India. It is located in the Shivamogga taluk of Shimoga district in Karnataka. It is 12 KM away Shivamogga town.

See also
 Districts of Karnataka
 Shivamogga
 Mangalore

References

External links
 http://Shimoga.nic.in/

Villages in Shimoga district